Bebearia chloeropis is a butterfly in the family Nymphalidae. It is found in the Republic of the Congo, the Central African Republic, the Democratic Republic of the Congo (Uele, Ituri, north Kivu, Equateur, Sankuru) and Uganda (the Bwamba Valley and Toro).

References

Butterflies described in 1908
chloeropis